The 2017 Individual Long Track/Grasstrack World Championship was the 47th edition of the FIM speedway Individual Long Track World Championship.

The world title was won by Mathieu Tresarrieu of France.

Venues

Final Classification

References 

2017
Speedway competitions in France
Speedway competitions in Germany
Speedway competitions in the Netherlands
Long
2017 in Dutch motorsport
2017 in German motorsport
2017 in French motorsport